Shacklewell is a small locality to the east of Roman Ermine Street (now the A10), in the London Borough of Hackney.

The area was originally a hamlet that developed on Shacklewell Lane in the Ancient Parish and later Metropolitan Borough of Hackney, now a part of the larger modern London Borough of Hackney.  The place name is no longer commonly used, and the areas is now generally regarded as part of Dalston, which was originally a separate hamlet 500 yards to the south, and also part of the Parish and Borough of Hackney.
  
Shacklewell took its name from "some springs or wells which were of high repute in former days, but the very site of which is now forgotten."

History
The place name was first recorded in 1490, when Thomas Cornish, a London saddler, had a tenant there.

The hamlet was one of four small settlements within the Parish of Hackney, (Dalston, Newington, Shacklewell, and Kingsland), which were all grouped for assessment purposes, together having only as many houses as the village of Hackney. The village of Shacklewell was settled on the eponymous village green, along Shacklewell Lane.

Shacklewell lay a little over 500 yards north of the hamlet of Dalston, which stood on Dalston Lane, with which it was linked by Cecilia Road.

John Heron, reputedly the richest man in Hackney, with extensive land-holding had his manor house at Shacklewell. Cecilia More, the youngest daughter of Sir Thomas More, the Roman Catholic martyr, married into the family in 1525. The house was later occupied by the Tyssen family, who owned large parts of Hackney.

One municipal building still standing is the former Shacklewell Washing Baths. This was a communal bath and washhouse. Simple bathhouses like these were once of great importance. Even into the 1960s, in some working-class areas of London many dwellings did not have their own bathrooms.

Largely residential in the mid-19th Century, the district gained some light industry later on, including Eyre & Spottiswoode's printworks and a saw mill. Although some industry remains, largely in Turkish hands, the area is no longer a significant commercial centre.

Although the place name is now little used, the historic street pattern of the original hamlet remains.

Growth and loss of sphere of identity
During the 19th century the area was urbanising and local identities were more fluid than before or since. For some of this period, Shacklewell was informally considered to extend north into West Hackney to include Rectory Road and the northern end of Amhurst Road. It was sometimes also seen to extend west of Stoke Newington Road to include the most southern part of Stoke Newington.

That sphere of self-identification has been almost completely lost. It is no longer common for a Londoner to refer to themselves as living in Shacklewell, the only people to do so now living in the immediate vicinity of the village core, and these would normally also consider the area a part of Dalston. In its way the district is an illustration of the mutable nature of place names in the capital. The lack of a railway station using the name Shacklewell and the consequent omission of the name from railway maps of the capital will have contributed to the decline of the name.

Electoral Ward
There is a Shacklewell electoral ward for Hackney Council, which, as electoral wards require roughly equal electorates, corresponds only very roughly to the area after which it is named.

The post-2014 ward boundaries straddle Stoke Newington Road, with the village core and its immediate surroundings (now part of Dalston) to the east, while the area west of the road is the southernmost part of Stoke Newington

Transport
The nearest London Overground station is the Dalston Kingsland railway station.

Education

Primary schools in the area include Shacklewell School and Halley House, and the secondary school the Petchey Academy, located on the site of the former Kingsland Secondary School

Entertainment
The Shacklewell Arms is a well known pub and live music venue. The pioneering dance music production duo Shut Up and Dance immortalized the Shacklewell Arms in its former life in their track The Green Man.

In popular culture
 In the book Career of Evil (2015) a murder in Shacklewell leads to the perpetrator being known as the "Shacklewell Ripper".

Nearest places
 Dalston
 Hackney Central
 Stoke Newington
 West Hackney

References

Districts of the London Borough of Hackney
Areas of London